Starlight  is a science fiction and fantasy series edited by Patrick Nielsen Hayden and published by Tor Books.

Volumes
 Starlight 1 (Tor, 1996)
 Starlight 2 (Tor, 1998)
 Starlight 3 (Tor, 2001)

Starlight 1
Volume 1, published in 1996.

Contents:
 "Introduction (Starlight 1)", essay by Patrick Nielsen Hayden
 "The Dead", short story by Michael Swanwick
 "Liza and the Crazy Water Man", novelette by Andy Duncan
 "Sister Emily's Lightship", short story by Jane Yolen
 "The Weighing of Ayre", novelette by Gregory Feeley
 "Killing the Morrow", short story by Robert Reed
 "The Ladies of Grace Adieu", novelette by Susanna Clarke
 "GI Jesus", short story by Susan Palwick
 "Waking Beauty", short story by Martha Soukup
 "Mengele's Jew", short story by Carter Scholz
 "Erase/Record/Play: A Drama for Print", novelette by John M. Ford
 "I Remember Angels", short story by Mark Kreighbaum
 "The Cost to Be Wise", novelette by Maureen F. McHugh
 "About the Authors", uncredited essay

Starlight 2
Volume 2, published in 1998.

Contents:
 "Introduction", essay by Patrick Nielsen Hayden
 "Divided by Infinity", novelette by Robert Charles Wilson
 "Mrs Mabb", novelette by Susanna Clarke
 "Lock Down", short story by M. Shayne Bell
 "Congenital Agenesis of Gender Ideation", short story by Raphael Carter
 "The House of Expectations", short fiction by Martha Soukup
 "A Game of Consequences", short story by David Langford
 "The Amount to Carry", novelette by Carter Scholz
 "The Death of the Duke", short story by Ellen Kushner
 "Brown Dust", short fiction by Esther M. Friesner
 "Access Fantasy", short story by Jonathan Lethem
 "The End of a Dynasty", novelette by Angélica Gorodischer
 "Snow", short story by Geoffrey A. Landis
 "Story of Your Life", novella by Ted Chiang
 "About the Authors" essay by Patrick Nielsen Hayden

Starlight 3
Volume 3, published in 2001.

Contents:
 "Introduction", essay by Patrick Nielsen Hayden
 "Hell Is the Absence of God", novelette by Ted Chiang
 "Sun-Cloud", short story by Stephen Baxter
 "Interview: On Any Given Day", short story by Maureen F. McHugh
 "Wings", short story by Colin Greenland
 "Gestella", novelette by Susan Palwick
 "The Barbarian and the Queen: Thirteen Views", short story by Jane Yolen
 "Wolves Till the World Goes Down", short story by Greg van Eekhout
 "The Secret Egg of the Clouds", short story by Geoffrey A. Landis
 "Home Is the Sailor", short story by Brenda W. Clough
 "Tom Brightwind, or, How the Fairy Bridge Was Built at Thoresby", novelette by Susanna Clarke
 "La Vie en Ronde", short story by Madeleine E. Robins
 "In Which Avu Giddy Tries to Stop Dancing", short story by D. G. Compton
 "Power Punctuation!", novelette by Cory Doctorow
 "The Sea Wind Offers Little Relief", novelette by Alex Irvine
 "Senator Bilbo", short story by Andy Duncan
 "The Old Rugged Cross", novelette by Terry Bisson
 "About the Authors", essay by Patrick Nielsen Hayden

Awards
Starlight 1 won the World Fantasy Award for best anthology in 1997.  

Starlight 2 was nominated for the World Fantasy Award for best anthology in 1999.  "The Death of the Duke" by Ellen Kushner, first published in Starlight 2, was nominated for the World Fantasy Award for best short fiction that year also.

References
 World Fantasy Awards List

Science fiction anthology series
Fantasy anthology series
Tor Books books